The Kafue Railway Bridge was built to carry the Livingstone to Lusaka railway line in what is now Zambia over the Kafue River in 1906. It is a steel girder truss bridge of 13 spans each of  supported on concrete piers. It was built for Mashonaland Railways, later merged into Rhodesian Railways which operated the line from 1927 until succeeded in Zambia by Zambia Railways in 1966.

With a length of  the Kafue Railway Bridge was the longest bridge on the Rhodesian Railways network.

See also
History of Zambia

References

Bridges in Zambia
Bridges completed in 1906
Railway bridges in Zambia
1906 establishments in the British Empire